Comal Independent School District is a public school district based in New Braunfels, Texas (USA).

Incorporated communities in the district include Bulverde, Garden Ridge, and portions of New Braunfels and Schertz. The unincorporated communities of Canyon Lake, Fischer, Sattler, Spring Branch, and Timberwood Park also lie within the district.

In 2009, the school district was rated "recognized" by the Texas Education Agency.

Schools

High schools

Grades 9-12
Canyon High School (New Braunfels) 
Canyon Lake High School (Fischer)
Smithson Valley High School (near Spring Branch)
Davenport High School (near San Antonio)
 Pieper High School (Timberwood Park)
Memorial Early College High School (New Braunfels): An Early College High School (ECHS), a New Technology High School (NTN), and a Science, Technology, Engineering, and Math Academy (STEM)

Middle schools
Grades 6-8
Canyon Middle School (New Braunfels)
Church Hill Middle School (New Braunfels) – formerly Canyon Intermediate
Danville Middle School (New Braunfels)
Mountain Valley Middle School (Sattler/Canyon Lake)
Pieper Ranch Middle School (San Antonio)
Smithson Valley Middle School (Spring Branch)
Spring Branch Middle School (Spring Branch)

Elementary schools

Grades PK-5
Arlon Seay Elementary School (Spring Branch)
Bill Brown Elementary School (near Spring Branch)
Clear Spring Elementary School (New Braunfels)
Freiheit Elementary School  (New Braunfels)
Garden Ridge Elementary School (Garden Ridge)
Goodwin Frazier Elementary School (New Braunfels)
Hoffmann Lane Elementary School (New Braunfels)
Indian Springs Elementary School (San Antonio)
Johnson Ranch Elementary School (Bulverde)
Kinder Ranch Elementary School (San Antonio)
Morningside Elementary School (New Braunfels)
Mountain Valley Elementary School (Sattler/Canyon Lake)
Oak Creek Elementary School (New Braunfels)
Rahe Bulverde Elementary School (Bulverde)
Rebecca Creek Elementary School (Canyon Lake)
Specht Elementary School (San Antonio)
Startzville Elementary School (Startzville/Canyon Lake)
Timberwood Park Elementary School (San Antonio)

References

External links
 

New Braunfels, Texas
School districts in Comal County, Texas
School districts in Bexar County, Texas
School districts in Hays County, Texas
School districts in Guadalupe County, Texas
School districts in Kendall County, Texas